The Manila massacre ( or Masaker sa Maynila), also called the Rape of Manila, involved atrocities committed against Filipino civilians in the City of Manila, the capital of the Philippines, by Japanese troops during the Battle of Manila (3 February 1945 – 3 March 1945) which occurred during World War II. The total number of civilians who were killed was at least 100,000.

The Manila massacre was one of several major war crimes committed by the Imperial Japanese Army, as judged by the postwar military tribunal. The Japanese commanding general, Tomoyuki Yamashita, and his chief of staff Akira Mutō, were held responsible for the massacre and other war crimes in a trial which started in October 1945. Yamashita was executed on 23 February 1946 and Mutō on 23 December 1948.

Description

Massacre

Before the battle, deciding that he would be unable to defend Manila with the forces available to him, and to preserve as large a force as possible in the rural mountain Luzon region of the Philippines, General Tomoyuki Yamashita had insisted on a complete withdrawal of Japanese troops from Manila in January 1945. However, Yamashita's order was ignored by about 10,000 Japanese marines under Rear Admiral Sanji Iwabuchi who chose to remain in Manila. About 4,000 Japanese army personnel were unable to leave the city due to the advance of the American and Filipino forces.

In the Battle of Manila from February to March 1945, the United States Army advanced into the city of Manila in order to drive the Japanese out. During lulls in the battle for control of the city, Japanese troops took their anger and frustration out on the civilians in the city. Violent mutilations, rapes, and massacres occurred in schools, hospitals and convents, including San Juan de Dios Hospital, Santa Rosa College, Santo Domingo Church, Manila Cathedral, Paco Church, St. Paul's Convent, and St. Vincent de Paul Church.

Dr Antonio Gisbert told of the murder of his father and brother at the Palacio del Gobernador, saying, "I am one of those few survivors, not more than 50 in all out of more than 3000 men herded into Fort Santiago and, two days later, massacred.

The Japanese forced Filipino women and children to be used as human shields into the front lines to protect Japanese positions. Those who survived were then murdered by the Japanese.

Mop-up operations
The Japanese conducted mop-up operations to clear north Manila of guerrillas, executing more than 54,000 Filipinos, including children, as they passed through towns.

Pregnant Filipino women were killed by having their bellies ripped open while Filipino civilians trying to flee were executed.

Mass rapes
The Bayview Hotel was used as a designated "rape center". According to testimony at the Yamashita war crimes trial, 400 women and girls were rounded up from Manila's wealthy Ermita district, and submitted to a selection board that picked out the 25 women who were considered most beautiful. These women and girls, many of them 12 to 14 years old, were then taken to the hotel, where Japanese enlisted men and officers took turns raping them.

Despite many allied Germans holding refuge in a German club, Japanese soldiers entered in and bayoneted infants and children of mothers pleading for mercy and raped women seeking refuge. At least 20 Japanese soldiers raped a young girl before slicing her breasts off after which a Japanese soldier placed her mutilated breasts on his chest to mimic a woman while the other Japanese soldiers laughed. The Japanese then doused the young girl and two other women who were raped to death in gasoline and set them all on fire.

The Japanese went on setting the entire club on fire killing many of its inhabitants. Women who were escaping out the building from the fire were caught and raped by the Japanese. 28-year-old Julia Lopez had her breasts sliced off, was raped by Japanese soldiers and had her hair set on fire. Another woman was partially decapitated after attempting to defend herself and raped by a Japanese soldier.

Death toll

The combined death toll of civilians for the Battle of Manila was about 100,000, most of which was attributed to massacres by Japanese forces. Some historians, citing a higher civilian casualty rate for the entire battle, suggest that 100,000 to 500,000 died as a result of the Manila massacre on its own, exclusive of other causes.

Extensive as were the Japanese atrocities during the battle, American artillery and firepower were most responsible for the destruction of Manila's architectural and cultural heritage and, according to one estimate, caused 40 percent of the total Filipino deaths during the battle.

General Yamashita's role in the massacre

Although Admiral Iwabuchi's marines had committed the atrocities and General Yamashita had earlier ordered him to evacuate Manila as he had, Yamashita was convicted as a war criminal for the Manila massacre. Iwabuchi himself committed suicide in the face of imminent defeat near the end of the Battle of Manila. Former war-crimes prosecutor and author Allan Ryan argues that there was no evidence that Yamashita committed crimes there, ordered others to do so, was in a position to prevent them, or even suspected they were about to happen. 

According to the Chief of the Government Section for the Supreme Commander for the Allied Powers and Chief of Civil Affairs Section, U.S. Army Forces, Pacific Ocean Area, Brigadier General Courtney Whitney, the problem with this argument was that Yamashita's lawyers resorted to using a chain of command technicality defense related to how the Japanese Navy were solely responsible for the massacre in Manila as a way to excuse Yamashita of committing all war crimes in the Philippines, of which there were many outside of Manila. Yamashita was actually held responsible for numerous other war crimes that the prosecution claimed was a systematic campaign to torture and kill Filipino civilians and Allied POWs as shown in the Palawan Massacre of 139 U.S. POWs, wanton executions of guerrillas, soldiers, and civilians without due process like the execution of Philippine Army general Vicente Lim in December 1944, and the massacre of 25,000 civilians in Batangas Province. These crimes that were committed outside of the Manila massacre were done by the Japanese Army, not the Navy. It was argued that Yamashita was in full command of the Japanese Army's secret military police, the Kempeitai, which committed numerous war crimes on POWs and civilian internees and he simply nodded his head without protest when asked by his Kempeitai subordinates to execute people without due process or trials because there were too many prisoners to do proper trials. Philippine Army generals Lim, Simeon de Jesus, and Fidel Segundo  were beheaded alongside hundreds of other people in mass graves by Army soldiers in Manila without a trial or due process on Yamashita's orders, long before Yamashita left Manila. The Japanese Navy and Rear Admiral Sanji Iwabuchi had nothing to do with the massacres done by Yamashita's Kempeitai and regular Army soldiers that were under his chain of command. Yamashita's lawyers tried to claim, to no avail, that for all of these Army massacres that Yamashita had no responsibility whatsoever and didn't know anything.

General MacArthur, five other generals, and the Supreme Court of the United States ultimately held Yamashita responsible for war crimes since he was in command of all Japanese troops in the Philippines at the time. President Harry S. Truman also agreed with the verdict and chose not to pardon Yamashita or commute his sentence. Yamashita was convicted on the grounds that he made no attempt to discover or stop atrocities from being committed. This would become known as the Yamashita standard. A group of American military lawyers attempted to defend General Yamashita by appealing to the U.S. Supreme Court, but the appeal failed, 5 votes to 2. As a result, Yamashita was sentenced to death by hanging. He was hanged on 23 February 1946 in a camp south of Manila. The two dissenting Supreme Court Justices called the entire trial a miscarriage of justice, an exercise in vengeance, and a denial of human rights.

See also
 Battle of Manila (1945)
 Bataan Death March
 De La Salle Brothers Philippine District
 Nanjing Massacre
 Philippine War Crimes Commission

Notes

References
 Taylor, Lawrence. A Trial of Generals. Icarus Press, South Bend IN, 1981

External links
 WW2DB: The Philippines Campaign
 The Battling Bastards of Bataan
 The Historical Atlas of the Twentieth Century by Matthew White

February 1945 events in Asia
March 1945 events in Asia
Massacres in 1945
Massacres of women
World War II massacres
Massacres in the Philippines
Massacres committed by Japan
History of Manila
1945 in Japan
1945 in the Philippines 
Conflicts in 1945
Japanese war crimes
Military history of the Philippines during World War II
Mass murder in 1945
War crimes in the Philippines
1945 murders in the Philippines
Violence against women in the Philippines